The 1999 World Fencing Championships were held in Seoul, South Korea. The event took place from November 1 to November 8, 1999. It was the first Fencing World Championship in which individual and team women's sabre competitions were held.

Medal summary

Men's events

Women's events

Medal table

References
FIE Results

World Fencing Championships
Sport in Seoul
1999 in South Korean sport
1990s in Seoul
International fencing competitions hosted by South Korea
1999 in fencing
November 1999 sports events in Asia
Sports competitions in Seoul